Morville Chote (born 6 October 1924) is a British former javelin thrower who competed in the 1948 Summer Olympics.

References

1924 births
Living people
British male javelin throwers
Olympic athletes of Great Britain
Athletes (track and field) at the 1948 Summer Olympics